Luzhou is a prefecture-level city in Sichuan, China. Luzhou can also refer to:

China
Luzhou District, Changzhi, Shanxi, China
Luzhou, Guangdong, a town in Huicheng District, Huizhou, Guangdong, China
Luzhou Township, a township in Shanggao County, Jiangxi, China

Taiwan
Luzhou District, New Taipei, Taiwan

Historical prefectures
Lu Prefecture (Anhui), a prefecture between the 6th and 13th centuries in modern Anhui

See also
Lu (disambiguation)